James Belton (1855 – 12 June 1935) was an Australian politician. He was born in Talbot, Victoria. In 1909 he was elected to the Tasmanian House of Assembly as a Labor member for Darwin. He was a minister from 1914 to 1916, but resigned to run (unsuccessfully) for the Senate in 1917. He was re-elected in a by-election in July of that year and served until his defeat in 1931. Belton died in 1935 at Wynyard.

References

1855 births
1935 deaths
Australian Labor Party members of the Parliament of Tasmania
Members of the Tasmanian House of Assembly
People from Victoria (Australia)